A serial killer is typically a person who murders three or more persons.

Serial killer can also refer to:

Art, entertainment, and media

Music
"Serial Killer" (song), an unreleased song recorded by American singer and songwriter Lana Del Rey
"Serial Killers" (song), a 2022 song by Gucci Mane
 Serial Killers, Vol. 1 (album), 2013 album by 'Serial Killers'
Serial Killers (musical group), a musical trio composed of B-Real, Xzibit, and Demrick

Other art, entertainment, and media
Serial killer memorabilia, also referred to as "murderabilia", a term identifying collectibles related to murders, murderers or other violent crimes
Serial Killers: The Method and Madness of Monsters, a non-fiction true crime history book by Peter Vronsky
Serial Killers: Richard Ramirez The Night-Time Stalker, a non-fiction true crime book about serial killer Richard Ramirez
Serial Killers Ink, a website dedicated to selling "murderabilia" 
SK1 (film), released in the United States as Serial Killer 1, a 2014 French thriller drama film directed by Frédéric Tellier
Serial Killer (festival), an international festival of TV and online series held in Brno, Czech Republic

See also

 List of serial killers by country
 Serial Killer X, a fictional character from the 2005 videogame Condemned: Criminal Origins
 Mrs. Serial Killer (film), a 2020 crime drama from India
 A.K.A. Serial Killer (film), a 1975 crime documentary from Japan
 
 Serial (disambiguation)
 Killer (disambiguation)
 Serial Thriller (disambiguation)
 cereal killer (disambiguation)